Remete may refer to:

 Hungarian name of Râmeț, a commune in Transylvania, Romania
 Remete, Zagreb, a former village now a neighbourhood of Maksimir, Zagreb, Croatia

See also
 Remeta (disambiguation)